The Tooth Fairy is a 2006 American horror film directed by Chuck Bowman. The film was produced by Stephen J. Cannell and was released on August 1, 2006 on DVD in the United States and Canada. Its runtime is 89 minutes.

Plot
In the 2006 in Northern California. When 12-year-old Pamela goes on vacation with her family to a bed and breakfast, the girl who lives next door tells her the "true story" of the Tooth Fairy: Many years earlier, the evil Tooth Fairy slaughtered a countless number of children to take their teeth, and now she has returned to kill Pamela and anyone else who gets in her way. The Tooth Fairy pursues the victims unrelentingly, which leads to a gruesome collection of events.

Cast
 Nicole Muñoz as Pamela Wagner
 Jianna Ballard as Emma Ange 
 Lochlyn Munro as Peter Campbell
 Chandra West as Darcy Wagner
 Steve Bacic as Cole
 Carrie Anne Fleming as Star Roberts
 Peter New as Chuck
 Jesse Hutch as Bobby Boulet
 Ben Cotton as Henry
 Sonya Salomaa as Cherise
 Karin Konoval as Elizabeth Craven
 P. J. Soles as Mrs. MacDonald

Reception
Steve Barton of Dread Central gave The Tooth Fairy a rating of 3 out of 5 and in a mildly positive review remarked about the film, "Should you put your brain on auto-pilot, you’ll have some fun."

References

External links

2006 direct-to-video films
2006 horror films
2006 films
American slasher films
American supernatural horror films
Films about tooth fairies
2000s slasher films
American exploitation films
American splatter films
2000s English-language films
Films directed by Chuck Bowman
2000s American films